Pilea peperomioides, the Chinese money plant, UFO plant, pancake plant or missionary plant, is a species of flowering plant in the nettle family Urticaceae, native to Yunnan and Sichuan provinces in southern China.

History
The Scottish botanist George Forrest was the first westerner to collect Pilea peperomioides, in 1906 and again in 1910, in the Cang Mountain range in Yunnan Province.

In 1945, the species was found by Norwegian missionary Agnar Espegren in Yunnan Province when he was fleeing from Hunan Province. He took cuttings of P. peperomioides back to Norway, by way of India in 1946, and from there it was spread throughout Scandinavia.

Pilea peperomioides is an example of a plant that has been spread amongst amateur gardeners via cuttings, without being well-known to western botanists until the late 20th century. This led to the plant earning the nickname of “friendship plant”, or “pass-along plant”. Many horticulturists and hobbyists were not aware of its true classification, in the nettle family Urticaceae, until the 1980s. The first known published image of it appeared in the Kew magazine in 1984. Through the early 2010s and 2020s, P. peperomioides became widely available commercially, and is no longer a curiosity. The initial offerings for sale on the mainstream plant market saw great demand for the plant, with prices going as high as $75 USD for a single unrooted cutting, advertised on Instagram, as late as 2019. The average price for a 3- or 4-inch pot being around $5-10 USD, with the median price for slightly larger plants capping out around $20 USD, in September of 2022. The affordable price, coupled with its ease of propagation, has led to a gradual decrease in cost (yet certainly not popularity) of this species.

Description
The leaves are described as peltate—circular, with the petiole attached near the centre. The plant is completely hairless. The stem is greenish to dark brown, usually unbranched and upright, and lignified at the base when mature. In poor growing conditions, it loses its leaves in the lower part of the stem and assumes a distinctive habit. The flowers are inconspicuous. 

The plant has a superficial resemblance to some species of Peperomia (hence the specific epithet peperomioides), also popular as cultivated plants but in a different family, the Piperaceae.  It is also sometimes confused with other peltate-leaved plants such as Nasturtium, Umbilicus and Hydrocotyle.

Range
This species occurs only in China: in the southwest of Sichuan province and the west of Yunnan province. It is endangered in its native habitat. However, it is kept in China and worldwide as an ornamental plant.

Cultivation
P. peperomioides is propagated from plantlets that sprout on the trunk of the parent plant (these are called offshoots) or from underground shoots (called rhizomes). These offshoots are often passed on as a lucky plant ("lucky thaler") or friendship plant. Since constant temperatures and high humidity have a positive effect on plant growth, this plant species is suitable for planting terrariums.

Although the plant is endangered in its native habitat, it is among the most popular houseplants today. It is in high demand because it is slim, easy to grow, and tolerates dry environments. However, it is not a new fad, and has been further popularized by social media trends on Instagram, TikTok, and other websites. The plant is readily available in retail greenhouses, which in turn are supplied by industrial-scale farming enterprises.

This species has gained the Royal Horticultural Society's Award of Garden Merit.

There are three different cultivars which have appeared in the last few years “Sugar”, “White Splash” and “Mojito.”

See also
Hydrocotyle vulgaris, a similar looking plant
Umbilicus rupestris, a succulent of similar appearance

References

 
 

Endemic flora of Yunnan
peperomioides
Plants described in 1912
 House plants